The 1981–82 season was the 102nd season of competitive football by Rangers.

Overview
Rangers played a total of 55 competitive matches during the 1981–82 season. Greig's fourth season in charge ended yet again without the league championship. Rangers finished third, twelve points behind Old Firm rivals Celtic who were champions. There was an apparent lack of ambition at the club due a lack of transfer funds which were being directed towards the redevelopment of Ibrox Park. There was the surprise signing of Northern Ireland international John McClelland from Mansfield Town. The Ulsterman proved to be a shrewd acquisition and later became the club captain. European participation was halted by Dukla Prague who soundly beat the team 3–0 in Prague and a 2-1 second leg win for Rangers was not enough for the team to progress. The domestic cup competitions provided successful ground as Rangers reached both finals. The team lost the 1982 Scottish Cup Final 4–1 to Aberdeen despite leading for the majority of the match. A late Aberdeen equaliser took the game into extra-time before the Dons added a trio. Rangers did win the 1981 Scottish League Cup Final by defeating Dundee United 2–1 with goals from Davie Cooper and Ian Redford.

Results
All results are written with Rangers' score first.

Scottish Premier Division

Cup Winners' Cup

Scottish Cup

League Cup

Glasgow Cup

Appearances

League table

See also
 1981–82 in Scottish football
 1981–82 Scottish Cup
 1981–82 Scottish League Cup
 1981–82 European Cup Winners' Cup

References 

Rangers F.C. seasons
Rangers